Made in the Manor is the fifth studio album by British rapper Kano. The album was released on 4 March 2016 by Parlophone Records and Bigger Picture Music. It is Kano's first album release for six years following Method to the Maadness (2010), featuring guest appearances from Wiley, Giggs, Jme and Damon Albarn. The production was handled by frequent collaborators Mikey J, Fraser T Smith, Blue May and Damon Albarn, alongside Jodi Milliner, Kwes, Mele, Rustie, Sam Beste, Swifta Beater and Zeph Ellis.

The album received positive reviews from critics and entered the UK Albums Chart at number 8, becoming Kano's highest-charting album in his career. It was shortlisted for the Mercury Prize in 2016. It also won 'Best Album' in the 2016 MOBO Awards.

Critical reception 

Made in the Manor was met with positive reviews upon its release. At Metacritic, which assigns a normalized rating out of 100 to reviews from music critics, the album has received an average score of 66, indicating "generally favorable reviews", based on nine reviews.

Accolades

Track listing

Notes
  signifies an additional producer

Sample credits
 "Hail" contains a sample of "Next Hype", written and performed by Tempa T.

Personnel 
 Kano – vocals, drum programming (6, 9), producer (6, 11, 13), bass (2) 
Fraser T. Smith – guitar (1), additional producer (1, 2), drums (2, 12), keyboards (6, 8, 9), piano (2, 6, 8, 9, 12), drum programming (6, 8, 9, 12), producer (2, 6, 8, 9, 11, 12), bass (2, 12), Synthesizer (2) 
Michael Asante – programming (1), producer (7, 10)
Rustie – producer (1)
Melé – producer (3)
Deanna Wilhelm – horn (6, 12)
Nubya Garcia – horn (6, 12) 
Rosie Turton – horn (12)
Blue May – keyboards (5, 7, 11, 13), programming (5, 7, 11, 13), additional producer (4, 7), electric guitar (13), drums (13)
Amy Langley – cello (5, 7), orchestra (7)
Amy Stanford – viola (5, 7)
Gita Langley – violin (5, 7) 
Rosie Langley – violin (5, 7)
Dirty pretty strings – string quartett (7)
Jodi Milliner – keyboards (5, 7, 11, 13), programming (5, 7, 11, 13), additional producer (5, 7, 13), producer (11), bass (5, 11)
Tawiah – backing vocals (8, 11)
Vula Malinga – backing vocals (8, 11)
Damon Albarn – keyboards (9), vocals (9)
Tom Skinner – drums (5, 11)
Sam Beste – piano (5, 11), vocoder (11), producer (11)
Kwes – bass (13), keyboards, (13), additional producer (13)
Zeph Ellis – producer (14) 
Jme – producer (15), vocals (15)
James Adams – trumpet (5) 
Ryan Jacobs – trumpet (5) 
the killer horns – horns (5) 
Simon Elms – trumpet (4) 
Colin Smith – saxophone (4)
Seifta Beater – producer (4) 
Giggs – vocals (4)
Wiley – vocals (4)

Charts

Certifications

Release history

References 

2016 albums
Kano (rapper) albums
Albums produced by Fraser T. Smith
Albums produced by Kwes